Edwin M. Pritchard (May 17, 1889 – April 3, 1976) was an American track and field athlete and a member of the Irish American Athletic Club who competed in the 1912 Summer Olympics.

He was born in Jersey City, New Jersey and died in Wheaton, Illinois.

In 1912 he was eliminated in the semi-finals of the 110 metre hurdles competition.

References

Sources

External links
Edwin Pritchard's profile at Sports Reference.com
Winged Fist Organization
Edwin Pritchard at FindAGrave

1889 births
1976 deaths
American male hurdlers
Olympic track and field athletes of the United States
Athletes (track and field) at the 1912 Summer Olympics